This is a list of American football players who have played for the Akron Pros in the National Football League (NFL).  It includes players that have played at least one match in the NFL regular season.  The Akron Pros franchise was founded around 1908 and lasted until 1926. The team folded in 1927. The club was known as the Akron Indians prior to 1920 and in 1926.



A
Dunc Annan

B
Frank Bacon,
Russ Bailey
John Barrett,
Marty Beck,
George Berry,
Scotty Bierce,
Frank Bissell,
Russ Blailock,
Wayne Brenkert,
Brooke Brewer,
Sol Butler

C
Knute Cauldwell,
Carl Cardarelli,
Chase Clements,
Alf Cobb,
Tuffy Conn,
Marty Conrad,
Charlie Copley,
Art Corcoran,
Earl Cramer,
Ken Crawford

D
Red Daum

E
Alex Edgar,
Bill Edgar

F
Guil Falcon,
Fanny Niehaus,
Jim Flower

G
Budge Garrett,
Art Garvey

H
Bruno Haas,
Art Haley,
Isham Hardy,
Harry Harris,
Dutch Hendrian,
Paul T. Hogan,
Frank Hogue

J
Walt Jean,
Pike Johnson,
Al Jolley,
Marshall Jones

K
Rip King,
Walt Kreinheder

M
Grover Malone,
Leo McCausland,
Frank McCormick,
Al Michaels,
Buck Miles,
Joe Mills,
Stan Mills,
Frank Moran

N
Bob Nash,
Ray Neal,
Al Nesser,
Harry Newman,
Olin Newman,
Frank Niehaus

P
Al Pierotti,
Fritz Pollard

R
Roy Ratekin,
Carl Reed,
Jim Roberts,
Jimmy Robertson,
Paul Robeson

S
Eddie Sauer,
Les Scott,
Walt Sechrist,
Ed Shaw,
Paul Sheeks,
Dutch Speck,
Bob Spiers,
Hugh Sprinkle,
Dick Stahlman,
Cliff Steele,
Charlie Stewart,
Fred Sweetland

T
Elgie Tobin,
Leo Tobin,
Tommy Tomlin

V
Tillie Voss

W
Dutch Wallace,
Milt Wilson

Z
Giff Zimmerman

Akron Pros
A